Craig Watson may refer to:
Craig Watson (boxer) (born 1983), British welterweight boxer
Craig Watson (footballer, born 1942) (1942–2001), Scottish footballer
Craig Watson (footballer, born 1995), Scottish footballer
Craig Watson (golfer) (born 1966), Scottish golfer
Craig Watson (speedway rider) (born 1976), competitive motorcyclist with the Birmingham Brummies
Craig Watson (triathlete) (born 1971), New Zealand triathlete